The Caracas Venezuela Temple is the 96th operating temple of the Church of Jesus Christ of Latter-day Saints (LDS Church).

History
In 1995, LDS Church president Gordon B. Hinckley announced plans to construct an LDS temple in Venezuela. Immediately following that announcement, a search was conducted to find a suitable site on which to build. Several properties were considered over the next eighteen months but none was chosen. It was finally decided the temple would be built in the city of Caracas on land that the church already owned. The groundbreaking of the Caracas Venezuela Temple took place in 1999.

Unexpected obstacles occurred during the construction of the temple. When digging the foundation, excavators discovered an underground spring. When the water was diverted, the excavation continued. However, the digging caused two major landslides. The first landslide did not cause any damage, but the second did. Eight tons of earth and materials were shifted in the slide. Despite these setbacks, the work was completed in just over a year and a half.

When Hinckley dedicated the temple on August 20, 2000, nearly six thousand members of the LDS Church were in attendance.

In 2020, the Caracas Venezuela Temple was closed temporarily during the year in response to the coronavirus pandemic.

See also

 Comparison of temples of The Church of Jesus Christ of Latter-day Saints
 List of temples of The Church of Jesus Christ of Latter-day Saints
 List of temples of The Church of Jesus Christ of Latter-day Saints by geographic region
 Temple architecture (Latter-day Saints)
 The Church of Jesus Christ of Latter-day Saints in Venezuela

References

Additional reading

External links
 
 Official Caracas Venezuela Temple page
 Caracas Venezuela Temple page
 The Caracas D. F. Venezuela Temple a brief history from announcement to dedication by Erin Howarth

20th-century Latter Day Saint temples
Buildings and structures in Caracas
Temples (LDS Church) completed in 2000
Temples (LDS Church) in Latin America
Temples (LDS Church) in South America
The Church of Jesus Christ of Latter-day Saints in Venezuela
2000 establishments in Venezuela
Temples in Venezuela